Battle Castle is an action documentary TV series co-produced by Parallax Film Productions Inc. with London-based Ballista Media Inc. It explores the medieval arms race reflected in castle construction in the Middle Ages and, using location filming, re-enactments and CGI reconstruction, tells the stories of six castles tested by siege. Hosted by Dan Snow, the series has aired on History Television, SBS Australia and most recently, Discovery UK.

Episodes

 Crac des Chevaliers
 Château Gaillard
 Dover Castle
 Conwy Castle
 Malbork Castle
 Málaga

Website

A website features games, motion comics and extra video content not seen on the show.

Book
Written by Dan Snow as an accompaniment to the show, the book Battle Castles: 500 Years of Knights and Siege Warfare details the stories of each castle featured in Battle Castle. Released on September 27, 2012.

References

External links
 Battle Castle Official Webpage

Historical television series
2012 Canadian television series debuts
2012 Canadian television series endings
2010s Canadian documentary television series